Journey to the One is a double album led by saxophonist Pharoah Sanders recorded in 1979 and released on the Theresa label.

Reception

In his review for AllMusic, Scott Yanow commented: "As usual, Sanders shifts between spiritual peace and violent outbursts in his tenor solos".

The authors of The Penguin Guide to Jazz Recordings called the music "strong, vibrant jazz," and wrote: "What's quickly apparent is that the gentler, more linear and melodic Sanders is not fundamentally different from the high-octane screamer, just differently modulated."

Writing for Jazzwise, Kevin Le Gendre stated: "Backed by a formidable band, Sanders moves seamlessly from tenderness to aggression all the while creating a compelling narrative over the two discs."

Chris May of All About Jazz included Journey to the One in his list of "Alternative Top Ten Albums," calling it "the album that introduced Sanders to a new generation of dancefloor-loving jazz neophytes."

In an article for Something Else!, S. Victor Aaron described the album as "a pretty accessible collection of tunes" and "a neat entry point into the music of a living legend."

A writer for Billboard praised the album's "superb playing," and noted: "there is something here that transcends labels."

Track listing
All compositions by Pharoah Sanders except where noted
 "Greetings to Idris" – 7:28    
 "Doktor Pitt" – 12:13    
 "Kazuko" – 8:07    
 "After the Rain" (John Coltrane) – 5:36    
 "Soledad" – 4:56    
 "You've Got to Have Freedom" – 6:48    
 "Yemenja" (John Hicks) – 5:35    
 "It's Easy to Remember" (Lorenz Hart, Richard Rodgers) – 6:32    
 "Think About the One" – 4:15    
 "Bedria" – 10:30

Personnel
Pharoah Sanders – tenor saxophone, tambura, sleigh bells
Eddie Henderson – flugelhorn (tracks 2 & 6)
John Hicks – piano (tracks 1,2 6–8 & 10) 
Joe Bonner – piano, electric piano (track 4 & 9)
Bedria Sanders – harmonium (track 5)
Paul Arslanian – harmonium, wind chimes (track 3)
Mark Isham – synthesizer (track 9)
James Pomerantz – sitar (track 5)
Yoko Ito Gates – koto (track 3)
Chris Hayes (track 10), Carl Lockett (tracks 1,7 & 9) – guitar  
Ray Drummond (tracks 1,2, 6–8 & 10), Joy Julks (track 9) – bass
Idris Muhammad (tracks 1,2, 6–8 & 10), Randy Merritt (track 9) – drums
Phil Ford – tabla (track 5)
Babatunde Lea – shekere, congas (track 9)
Dee Dee Dickerson, Bobby McFerrin, Vicki Randle, Ngoh Spencer – vocals (tracks 6 & 9)
Claudette Allen – vocals (track 9)

References

1980 albums
Pharoah Sanders albums
Theresa Records albums